The Eastern Congolian swamp forests are a fairly intact but underresearched ecoregion of the tropical and subtropical moist broadleaf forests biome. It is located within the Democratic Republic of the Congo. This is the eastern half of one of the largest areas of swamps in the world.

Setting

Climate
The climate is tropical and humid, with little seasonal variation. Average annual rainfall exceeds 2000 mm.

Flora
The forest is a mixture of habitats including wetlands and swamps, with drier forest and savanna slightly higher and flooded seasonally by the Congo and its tributaries.

Fauna
The region has been insufficiently researched by zoologists but is known to be home to forest elephants (Loxodonta africana cyclotis) (which may have been reduced by poaching, especially near the larger rivers), and several primates, including the rare bonobo (Pan paniscus).
The Congo is a natural barrier to movement of wildlife and many species only occur on this eastern side of the river, including many primates: the bonobo and also Angolan colobus (Colobus angolensis), Wolf's mona monkey (Cercopithecus wolfi), golden-bellied mangabey (Cercocebus galeritus chrysogaster), black mangabey (Lophocebus atterimus aterrimus), southern talapoin (Miopithecus talapoin) and the Dryas monkey (Cercopithecus dryas).

Near-endemic mammals include Hutterer's brush-furred mouse (Lophuromys huttereri), Allen's striped bat (Chalinolobus alboguttatus), and Muton's soft-furred mouse (Praomys mutoni).

These rainforests are rich in birdlife including the Congo sunbird (Cinnyris congensis), African river martin (Pseudochelidon eurystomina) and Congo martin (Riparia congica).

Endemic amphibians and reptiles include a small frog (Cryptothylax minutus), Chapin's chameleon (Trioceros chapini), a wall lizard (Gastropholis tropidopholis), the Zaire snake-eater (Polemon robustus), and a worm lizard (Zygaspis dolichomenta).

Threats and conservation
The Congo River allows access to these forests with subsequent logging and poaching of wildlife, particularly of forest elephants.

Protected areas
25.65% of the ecoregion is in protected areas. Protected areas include the huge Salonga National Park, Lomami National Park, Yangambi Biosphere Reserve, Lomako-Yokokala Nature Reserve, and Tumba-Lediima Nature Reserve. Salonga National Park is also designated a World Heritage Site. The Ngiri Ramsar Site, a designated wetland of international importance, covers a portion of the ecoregion.

See also
 Congolian forests
Flora of West-Central Tropical Africa

References

External links

 Eoearth.org: Salonga National Park
 Plexusowls.com: Detailed study of Salonga National Park
 Zoosociety.org: Bonobo conservation in Salonga National Park 

Afrotropical ecoregions
Congolian forests
Ecoregions of the Democratic Republic of the Congo

Tropical and subtropical moist broadleaf forests